This page presents the results of the Men's and Women's Volleyball Tournament during the 2003 Pan American Games, which was held from August 1 to August 17, 2003, in Santo Domingo, Dominican Republic. There were four medal events, two (indoor and beach) for both men and women.

Men's indoor tournament

Squads

Preliminary round

Group A

 August 3

 August 5

 August 7

Group B

 August 4

 August 6

 August 8

Quarterfinals
 August 10

Final round

Semifinals
 August 13

Finals

Classification match (7th/8th place)
 August 10

Classification match (5th/6th place)
 August 11

Bronze-medal match
 August 15

Gold-medal match
 August 15

Final standings

Individual awards

 Most Valuable Player
  Ernardo Gómez
 Best Attacker
  Ronald Méndez
 Best Scorer
  Ernardo Gómez
 Best Defender
  Nalbert Bittencourt
 Best Setter
  Rodman Valera

 Best Server
  Gabriel Gardner
 Best Receiver
  Yasser Portuondo
 Best Libero
  Sergio Santos
 Best Blocker
  Gustavo Endres

Team rosters

 Maurício Lima
 Ricardo García
 Dante Amaral
 Nalbert Bitencourt
 Giba
 Anderson Rodrigues
 André Nascimento
 André Heller
 Gustavo Endres
 Rodrigo Santana
 Giovane Gávio
 Sérgio Santos

 Tomás Aldazabal
 Javier Brito
 Yosleides Herrera
 Raydel Corrales
 Odelvis Dominico
 Ariel Gil
 Javier González
 Osmany Juantorena
 Pavel Pimienta
 Yasser Portuondo
 Maikel Salas
 Charles Vinent

 Juan Carlos Blanco
 Luis Díaz
 Thomas Ereu
 Hernardo Gómez
 Carlos Luna
 Andrés Manzanillo
 Iván Márquez
 Ronald Méndez
 Andy Rojas
 Carlos Tejeda
 Gustavo Valderrama
 Rodman Valera

 Brook Billings
 Scott Bunker
 Gabriel Gardner
 David McKienzie
 Adam Naeve
 James Polster
 William Priddy
 Salmon Riley
 Christopher Siefert
 Erik Sullivan
 Donald Suxho
 Mackay Wilson

Women's indoor tournament

Squads

Preliminary round

Group A

 August 3

 August 5

 August 7

Group B

 August 4

 August 6

 August 8

Quarterfinals
 August 10

Final round

Semifinals
 August 13

Finals

Classification match (7th/8th place)
 August 11

Classification match (5th/6th place)
 August 12

Bronze-medal match
 August 14

Gold-medal match

Final standings

Awards

 Most Valuable Player
  Yudelkys Bautista
 Best Attacker
  Nancy Carrillo
 Best Scorer
  Nicole Branagh
 Best Defender
  Cosiri Rodríguez
 Best Setter
  Lizzy Fitzgerald

 Best Server
  Annerys Vargas
 Best Receiver
  Cosiri Rodríguez
 Best Libero
  Evelyn Carrera
 Best Blocker
  Annerys Vargas

References

External links
 Brazilian site with full results
 FIVB Press Release (Male)
 FIVB Press Release (Female)

 
P
2003
Events at the 2003 Pan American Games
International volleyball competitions hosted by the Dominican Republic